Florey is an unincorporated community in Andrews County, in the U.S. state of Texas. According to the Handbook of Texas, the community had a population of 25 in 2000. It is located within the Andrews, Texas micropolitan area.

History
Florey was named for a pioneer rancher who settled in the community in 1908, and his name was A.J. Florey. It was originally called Smackover when it was first formed around 1903 by Pete Hollebeke, Willis Howell, Bob Hill, and a family called the Jimerson family. A post office was established at Florey in 1909, and Lee N. Smith was the postmaster. A camp for an oil company called Humble Oil Company, which would later be called Exxon, was established at the townsite in 1934. The area of the settlement was extended to where it currently stands along U.S. Highway 385 sometime after the Humble Oil Company went into operation. There was only one store and an overall population of 50 residents in 1940. The camp was then closed in 1958, and on September 22 of that same year, the Humble Oil Company donated the camp to Andrews County so they could turn it into a park. It then consisted of just that park in 1978. It then reported a population of 25 residents in both 1990 and 2000.

Geography

Education
Florey's first school was established in 1909, and Miss Edna McCorkle was hired as the school's teacher. It then became a part of the Andrews Independent School District on December 15, 1938. The community is still currently served by the Andrews ISD to this day since the whole county is one whole school district.

References

Unincorporated communities in Andrews County, Texas
Unincorporated communities in Texas